Tornoconia is a genus of moths of the family Nolidae. The genus was erected by Emilio Berio in 1866.

Species
 Tornoconia artemis Viette, 1972
 Tornoconia mabillei Viette, 1972
 Tornoconia panda Viette, 1972
 Tornoconia royi Berio, 1966

References

Chloephorinae